In seven-dimensional geometry, a hexicated 7-cube is a convex uniform 7-polytope, including 6th-order truncations (hexication) from the regular 7-cube.

There are 32 hexications for the 7-cube, including all permutations of truncations, cantellations, runcinations, sterications, and pentellations. 20 are represented here, while 12 are more easily constructed from the 7-orthoplex.

The simple hexicated 7-cube is also called an expanded 7-cube, with only the first and last nodes ringed, is constructed by an expansion operation applied to the regular 7-cube. The highest form, the hexipentisteriruncicantitruncated 7-cube is more simply called a omnitruncated 7-cube with all of the nodes ringed.

These polytope are among a family of 127 uniform 7-polytopes with B7 symmetry.

Hexicated 7-cube

In seven-dimensional geometry, a hexicated 7-cube is a convex uniform 7-polytope, a hexication (6th order truncation) of the regular 7-cube, or alternately can be seen as an expansion operation.

Alternate names
 Small petated hepteract (Jonathan Bowers)

Images

Hexitruncated 7-cube

Alternate names
 Petitruncated hepteract (Jonathan Bowers)

Images

Hexicantellated 7-cube

Alternate names
 Petirhombated hepteract (Jonathan Bowers)

Images

Hexiruncinated 7-cube

Alternate names
 Petiprismated hepteract (Jonathan Bowers)

Images

Hexicantitruncated 7-cube

Alternate names
 Petigreatorhombated hepteract (Jonathan Bowers)

Images

Hexiruncitruncated 7-cube

Alternate names
 Petiprismatotruncated hepteract (Jonathan Bowers)

Images

Hexiruncicantellated 7-cube  

In seven-dimensional geometry, a hexiruncicantellated 7-cube is a uniform 7-polytope.

Alternate names
 Petiprismatorhombated hepteract (Jonathan Bowers)

Images

Hexisteritruncated 7-cube

Alternate names
 Peticellitruncated hepteract (Jonathan Bowers)

Images

Hexistericantellated 7-cube

Alternate names
 Peticellirhombihepteract (Jonathan Bowers)

Images

Hexipentitruncated 7-cube

Alternate names
 Petiteritruncated hepteract (Jonathan Bowers)

Images

Hexiruncicantitruncated 7-cube

Alternate names
 Petigreatoprismated hepteract (Jonathan Bowers)

Images

Hexistericantitruncated 7-cube

Alternate names 
 Peticelligreatorhombated hepteract (Jonathan Bowers)

Images

Hexisteriruncitruncated 7-cube

Alternate names
 Peticelliprismatotruncated hepteract (Jonathan Bowers)

Images

Hexisteriruncicantellated 7-cube

Alternate names
 Peticelliprismatorhombihepteract (Jonathan Bowers)

Images

Hexipenticantitruncated 7-cube

Alternate names
 Petiterigreatorhombated hepteract (Jonathan Bowers)

Images

Hexipentiruncitruncated 7-cube

Alternate names
 Great petacellated hepteract (Jonathan Bowers)

Images

Hexisteriruncicantitruncated 7-cube

Alternate names
 Great petacellated hepteract (Jonathan Bowers)

Images

Hexipentiruncicantitruncated 7-cube

Alternate names
 Petiterigreatoprismated hepteract  (Jonathan Bowers)

Images

Hexipentistericantitruncated 7-cube

Alternate names
 Petitericelligreatorhombihepteract (acronym: putcagroh) (Jonathan Bowers)

Images

Omnitruncated 7-cube 

The omnitruncated 7-cube is the largest uniform 7-polytope in the B7 symmetry of the regular 7-cube. It can also be called the hexipentisteriruncicantitruncated 7-cube which is the long name for the omnitruncation for 7 dimensions, with all reflective mirrors active.

Alternate names
 Great petated hepteract (Jonathan Bowers)

Images

Notes

References 
 H.S.M. Coxeter: 
 H.S.M. Coxeter, Regular Polytopes, 3rd Edition, Dover New York, 1973 
 Kaleidoscopes: Selected Writings of H.S.M. Coxeter, edited by F. Arthur Sherk, Peter McMullen, Anthony C. Thompson, Asia Ivic Weiss, Wiley-Interscience Publication, 1995,  
 (Paper 22) H.S.M. Coxeter, Regular and Semi Regular Polytopes I, [Math. Zeit. 46 (1940) 380-407, MR 2,10]
 (Paper 23) H.S.M. Coxeter, Regular and Semi-Regular Polytopes II, [Math. Zeit. 188 (1985) 559-591]
 (Paper 24) H.S.M. Coxeter, Regular and Semi-Regular Polytopes III, [Math. Zeit. 200 (1988) 3-45]
 Norman Johnson Uniform Polytopes, Manuscript (1991)
 N.W. Johnson: The Theory of Uniform Polytopes and Honeycombs, PhD (1966)
  x3o3o3o3o3o4x - , x3x3o3o3o3o3x- , x3o3o3x3o3o4x - , x3x3x3o3o3o4x - , x3x3o3x3o3o4x - , x3o3x3x3o3o4x - , x3o3x3o3o3x4x - , x3o3x3o3x3o4x - , x3x3o3o3o3x4x - , x3x3x3x3o3o4x - , x3x3x3o3x3o4x - , x3x3o3x3x3o4x - , x3o3x3x3x3o4x - , x3x3x3oxo3x4x - , x3x3x3x3x3o4x - , x3x3x3o3x3x4x - , x3x3o3x3x3x4x - , x3x3x3x3x3x4x -

External links 
 Polytopes of Various Dimensions
 Multi-dimensional Glossary

7-polytopes